Ama may refer to:

Ama language (New Guinea)
Ama language (Sudan)